Michael Trotter (born 27 October 1969) is an English former professional footballer who played in the Football League, as a midfielder.

References

Sources

1969 births
Living people
Footballers from Hartlepool
English footballers
Association football midfielders
Middlesbrough F.C. players
Doncaster Rovers F.C. players
Darlington F.C. players
Leicester City F.C. players
Chesterfield F.C. players
Buxton F.C. players
Halifax Town A.F.C. players
Rugby Town F.C. players
English Football League players